The Alaska Sports Hall of Fame honors Alaskan athletes, coaches, contributors, recurring events, and historic moments that have significantly impacted the sporting landscape of Alaska.  The Hall was established in 2006 and the first class was inducted in 2007, with new inductees announced in December and added in February. The museum is currently on display at the Ted Stevens Anchorage International Airport.



History and organization
The Alaska Sports Hall of Fame inducted its first class of five people, two moments, and one event in 2007, a group including dog mushers Susan Butcher and George Attla, Olympic medalists Tommy Moe and Kristen Thorsness, and National Hockey League Calder Memorial Trophy winner Scott Gomez.

New members, events, and moments are nominated and voted upon by the public each fall, with the results determining which nominees reach the selection panel ballot.  The inductees are chosen by a voting panel of 8 members of the media and longtime Alaskan sport contributors with the public voting results equivalent to one member of the panel.  The inductees are honored with a ceremony each February in the ConocoPhillips Building atrium. Plaques for each inductee are displayed on level 0 of the Ted Stevens Anchorage International Airport.

Inductees
The 2012 nominees for induction will be determined by a public vote in Fall 2011.

The Class of 2020 inductees, two people (Marcie Trent and Matt Carle), one event (Yukon 800), and one moment (University of Alaska Anchorage Upset of Boston College in the 1991 NCAA Hockey Tournament), had their induction ceremony postponed until April 2022 due to the COVID-19 pandemic.

The current members, events, and moments of the Alaska Sports Hall of Fame are listed below.

References

Halls of fame in Alaska
State sports halls of fame in the United States
All-sports halls of fame
Sports hall of fame inductees
2006 establishments in Alaska
Hall Of Fame
Awards established in 2006
Non-profit organizations based in Anchorage, Alaska
Ted Stevens Anchorage International Airport